Alberto R. Cutié (born April 29, 1969, in San Juan, Puerto Rico) is a Puerto Rican Episcopal priest who is also known as Padre Alberto. He was ordained as a Catholic priest in 1995. He has an internationally recognizable name, due to his work as the host of television and radio programs.

Cutié left the Catholic Church in May 2009 after publication of photographs showing him with a woman at the beach and his subsequent admission that he was in love.  He has said that mandatory celibacy was only one of the theological differences that led him to leave the Catholic Church. He later married Ruhama Buni Canellis and joined the Episcopal (Anglican) Church. He now serves as rector of St. Benedict's, an Episcopal parish in Plantation, Florida.

Media appearances
Cutié, the middle child and son of Cuban exiles, was born in San Juan, Puerto Rico. As a teenager he worked as a DJ.

He was ordained a Roman Catholic priest of the Archdiocese of Miami in 1995, the first ordinand of the then-newly designated Archbishop John Favalora (retired 2010). Father Albert (popularly known as Padre Alberto) was the first priest or clergy person of any religious tradition to host a secular talk show both on radio and television. He is also a regular columnist whose writings appear in many Spanish language newspapers throughout the United States and Latin America. He gained worldwide recognition with his television debut in 1999 as the host of Padre Alberto (and later Cambia tu Vida con el Padre Alberto), a daily talk show televised on the Telemundo network. He later served as host of the weekly program America en Vivo on Telemundo International.

Beginning in 2002, Cutié hosted a weekly talk program called Hablando Claro con el Padre Alberto, reaching millions of households throughout the United States, Canada, Spain and Latin America on EWTN Español, which is part of the global network founded by Mother Angelica. In July 2003 he officiated at Celia Cruz's Funeral Mass in Miami, Florida.

Cutié also published his first self-help book, Real Life, Real Love (Ama de Verdad, Vive de Verdad) in January 2006. It sold thousands of copies and became a bestseller in the Spanish language market. His second book, Dilemma: A Priest's Struggle with Faith and Love (Dilema: La Lucha de un Sacerdote Entre Su Fe y el Amor), was released on January 4, 2011. He has been labeled as "Father Oprah" by various publications. He served as president and general director of Radio Paz and Radio Peace Catholic 24-hour radio station beginning in January 2001. He hosted several radio programs, such as Al Dia and Linea Directa, and directed the daily operations of Pax Catholic Communications for the Archdiocese of Miami until 2009. On April 2, 2009, he was named one of AARP's new Hispanic ambassadors.

On January 4, 2011, Cutié released a memoir, Dilemma. To promote the book, he appeared on Good Morning America, The View, Fox and Friends, and The Joy Behar Show as well as several national Spanish language television programs, including Don Francisco Presenta, Despierta America, and Al Rojo Vivo.

In 2020 he worked with Univision as the host of a radio program, and later that year, began to host his popular television program  "Hablando Claro con el Padre Alberto" on Mega TV (owned and operated by SBS - Spanish Broadcasting System). Padre Alberto is known for his no-nonsense style and his program deals with a variety of issues of special interest to a diverse Latino community throughout the USA and Puerto Rico.

Personal life
On May 5, 2009, Cutié asked church officials for a time of reflection and a leave of absence from his media programs and pastoral work after publication of pictures in which he was shown kissing and touching Ruhama Buni Canellis at a public beach while still a Catholic priest. Cutié asked the Archdiocese of Miami for some time to think and make a decision on where his life as a priest was heading.
As a result, the Archdiocese of Miami granted him a leave of absence for an undefined period of personal decision making. After meeting with two of his bishops and informing them of his decision, he chose to continue his ministry as a married priest in the Episcopal Church, part of the Anglican Communion.

On May 11, 2009, Cutié was interviewed by Maggie Rodriguez of CBS' The Early Show. He said that he was thinking about leaving the Roman Catholic Church for a woman he loves. He said that he respected the existing rule of mandatory celibacy and acknowledged that some priests remain dedicated to that calling. There are many priests in communion with the Vatican who are married, but they are not members of the Latin Rite. He stated he did not want to become the "anti-celibacy priest".

On May 13, 2009, Cutié was interviewed by Teresa Rodríguez on the Univision show Aquí y Ahora. He said: "I do regret if my actions hurt people with all my heart", adding "[t]here are other ways to serve God. I am not the same man I was when I entered the seminary 22 years ago." By the end of the month Cutié announced that he had been in the process of discerning entering the Episcopal Church for the last couple of years, which in turn helped him consolidate marriage and his calling to serve God.

On July 11, 2011, Cutié aired his first English-speaking syndicated daytime talk show, Father Albert.  The show was produced by Debmar-Mercury, the same company that syndicates South Park and Family Feud as a summer test-run.

Father Albert returned to daily radio with Univision in March 2020, during the COVID-19 pandemic with a daily call-in Talk-Show which had a huge reception by the Latino audience. In 2021, he returned to daytime television with a new version of his long-time Talk-Show "Hablando Claro con el Padre Alberto" on Mega TV, part of the Spanish Broadcasting System (SBS) conglomerate of radio and television stations.

Reception into the Episcopal Church and marriage
Cutié was received into the Episcopal Church on May 28, 2009, by the Right Reverend Leo Frade, the Cuban-born bishop of the Episcopal Diocese of Southeast Florida and became the administrator and pastoral minister of the Episcopal Church of the Resurrection in Biscayne Park, Miami, Florida, where he was licensed as a pastoral assistant. He was received as an Episcopal priest and instituted as priest-in-charge of the parish on May 29, 2010.

On June 26, 2009, Cutié and Ruhama Buni Canellis married in a church ceremony at St. Bernard de Clairvaux Church in North Miami Beach. Bishop Frade officiated, assisted by the Right Reverend Onell Soto (retired Episcopal Bishop of Venezuela) and several other Episcopal clergy.

Cutié is serving as rector of St. Benedict's Parish in Plantation, Florida. On November 30, 2010, his wife gave birth to their first child, daughter Camila Victoria Cutié. They are also the parents of Christian Norton from Cutié's wife's first marriage. She gave birth to a son in May 2012 named Alberto Felipe Cutié. Cutié celebrated the baptisms of both his children.

References

External links

 
 St. Benedict's Episcopal Church
 
 Padre Alberto on the Internet Movie Database

1969 births
Living people
Puerto Rican people of Cuban descent
American Episcopalians
Converts to Anglicanism from Roman Catholicism
People from Miami-Dade County, Florida
Telemundo